This is an alphabetical list of notable technology terms. These terms includes that use in Internet, computer and other devices.

A

 Accelerometer
 ADSL
 Android
 Archive
 Artificial Intelligence
 ATX
 Apple Inc.

B

 Backup
 Bandwidth
 Benchmark
 Barcode
 Booting or Boot loader
 BIOS
 Bitmap
 Bitcoin
 BitTorrent
 Blacklist
 Bluetooth
 Binary
 Backlink
 Bloatware
 Broadband Lifecycle
 Bus
 Burn

C

 C
 C++
 C#
 Cache
 Central processing unit
 Client
 CMOS
 Compression
 Content
 Cookie
 Code
 Coding
 CPU
 Cyber crime
 Cybersecurity

D

 Daemon
 Data 
 Debug
 Determinancy diagramming
 Developer
 Device driver
 Digital subscriber line (DSL)
 Dock
 DOS
 DPI
 Driver
 DRM

E

 Encryption
 Emulator
 Ethernet
 End user
 Encoding
 EXE
 Executable
 Exabyte
 Exbibyte
 Email

F

 FAT32
 Firewall
 Firmware
 Framework
 Freeware
 Frictionless sharing
 FTP

G

 GIF
 Git
 GPS
 GSM
 GUI

H

 HDMI
 HTML
 HTTP
 HTTPS

I

 I/O
 IEEE
 Internet
 Internetworking
 Internet Protocol (IP)
 iOS
 IP Address
 ISO
 IMEI
 ISP

J

 JAVA
 JavaScript
 JPEG

K

 Kernel
 Keyboard
 kSQL

L

LTE
LTE-Sim

M

 Machine
 Macintosh (Mac)
 Malware
 MIDI
 Monotonic query
 MPEG
 MP3
 MP4
 MMS

N

 Newbie

O

 Object-oriented programming (OOP)
 OEM
 OS
 OCR
 OSI (7-layer) model
 Overclock
 Overheat

P

 PDF
 Phishing
 Python
 Plug-in
 PNG
 Processor

Q

 QWERTY

R

 Recycle bin
 Remote access
 Registry
 Read-only memory (ROM)
 RAID
 Rooting
 RAM

S

 Safe mode
 Scalable vector graphics (SVG)
 Search engine
 Search engine optimization
 Secure Sockets Layer (SSL)
 SEO
 Server
 Service pack
 Software
 Source code
 Spam
 SSID
 SVGA
 Swype

T

 Trash

U

 Underclock
 Unix

V

 Virus
 Vector graphics
 VGA
 VOIP (Voice Over IP)

W

 Web
 WebM
 Wi-Fi and Hotspot (Wi-Fi)
 Wikipedia Zero
 Windows
 Wireless LAN
 World Wide Web
 WYSIWYG
 WPA

Y

 Y2K

See also
 Glossary of Internet-related terms
 List of computer term etymologies
 List of HTTP status codes
 List of information technology acronyms
 List of operating systems

Technical terminology